Hollygrove or sometimes Holly Grove is a townland of 283 acres in Athleague parish, Killeroran district, Killian barony, Union of Mountbellew, in County Galway, Ireland. Hollygrove is adjacent to the townland of Coalpits and is on the border of Roscommon and Galway.

Hollygrove Lake
Hollygrove Lake is a  lake located between Ballygar and Athleague, downstream of Rookwood Bridge on the River Suck system. It is within half a kilometre of the main River Suck. It is primarily stocked with tench and pike.

Griffiths Primary Valuation
Griffith's valuation between 1848 and 1864, lists the following people in Hollygrove who leased the land they farmed:
Patrick Byrne
John Droody  
James Feeney 
John Gouran 
Luke Hannelly 
John Hogan (1828-1886) who married Winifred Conboy (1827-?)
Bernard Kelly
Thomas Kerin
Hannelly Leonard
Michael Leonard
Thomas Moran
Patrick Reilly 
John Torpy

References

Athleague
Towns and villages in County Galway